The Schlossberg is a mountain of the Urner Alps, located between Engelberg and Erstfeld in Central Switzerland. It lies north of the Gross Spannort in the canton of Uri.

The Schlossberg is composed of several summit of which the higher (named Hinter Schloss) has an elevation of 3,133 metres.

References

External links
 Schlossberg on Hikr

Mountains of Switzerland
Mountains of the Alps
Alpine three-thousanders
Mountains of the canton of Uri